Adnoartina is known as a religious deity in the Australian Aboriginal culture. This deity is described as taking the form of a gecko lizard and is considered to be a sacred ancestral being. Adnoartina offers an Indigenous understanding to the creation of Uluru, an Australian historical landmark. This landmark is regarded as one of the most sacred land formations in Australia and an ‘iconic’ tourist attraction. As Adnoartina is a key figure in the creation of Uluru, this deity is a symbolic figure in the Aboriginal religion.

Adnoartina is central to one of the world's oldest religious beliefs as Aboriginal mythology has existed for centuries. However, the significance of Adnoartina continues to be a cultural influence as stories are passed down through generations of ancestors. Such stories are known as dreamtime stories, which are fundamental to the Aboriginal religion. Though Adnoartina originates from Aboriginal mythology, this deity is further present in published academia. The published studies of Adnoartina have communicated the significance of this deity in the Aboriginal culture. Adnoartina is regarded as a spiritual figure in the dreamtime and continues to be a motif in the art, music and ceremonial practices of the Aboriginal culture.

Origin 

Adnoartina is derived from the Indigenous Diyari people, alternatively transcribed as ‘Dieri.' The Diyari community is located in South Australia, east of Lake Eyre. This cultural group recognise Adnoartina as one of the great spirits in dreamtime stories.

The story of Adnoartina 

The god always helps and protects uluru. The gender of Adnoartina varies between being curvy or straight stories as this deity is commonly referred to as a female goddess however, other stories describe Adnoartina as a male god or a non-gendered being. Adnoartina’s story is a teaching of creation and essentially describes how Uluru came to have its red ochre. The narrative follows the rivalry between Adnoartina and Marandi the dog as they hunted the same prey. According to legend, Adnoartina challenged Marandi and as they fought, Adnoartina bit into Marandi’s neck, spilling his blood onto Uluru and staining it red. The story further details how geckos were shaped to fend off predators as Adnoartina’s tail was used as protection during the fight. The following extract is sourced from Aiston and Horne’s published book from the year 1924.

“Marindi the dog leapt up and tried to catch Adnoartina by the back of the neck and shake the life out of him. But the lizard ran in low beneath the terrible fighting teeth. He seized the dog by the throat and hung on. In vain Marindi shook him and scratched at him with his claws. The sharp teeth sank in and in, until at last the red blood spurted out."

There have been alternative understandings of Adnoartina as not all stories link to the ochre of Uluru. In some narratives, the stain from Marandi’s blood is the source of ochre from the Pukardu Hill site. This site is dual-named by the Government of South Australia as ‘Parachilna Ochre Mine’ and ‘Vukartu Ithapi’ and is located 19 kilometres (12 miles) south-east of the Flinders Ranges. In other stories, Marandi’s blood is the source of ochre from the rocks on the banks of the Mecca creek, located in the Cloncurry Shire region in Queensland. However, the dominant narrative is that the story of Adnoartina relates to the ochre of Uluru.

Similar deities 

As the ochre from Uluru is spiritually valued across various tribal groups, there have been accounts of similar deities to Adnoartina. As Adnoartina is derived from the Diyari people, different tribes recognise deities such as 'Kuringii', 'Kilowilina', 'Perilingunina', 'Itikaru' and 'Tjapara' as key figures in the creation of red ochre. Therefore, dreamtime stories are diverse in perspective as these deities are often described as taking the form of an emu. However, a link across all stories is the belief that Uluru’s red ochre was created from the blood of a sacred being.

Anthropological developments 

Though Adnoartina has existed for centuries in the Aboriginal culture, this deity was introduced to a global audience through observational studies. For example, the published work of ethnographer George Aiston and anthropologist George Horne offers direct knowledge of Adnoartina from the 1920s. Aiston in particular lived with the Diyari people for many years and translated the story of Adnoartina for English speaking people. This has contributed to the knowledge of Adnoartina through the observations and documentation of the Aboriginal culture. However, this western means of publication has the potential to be culturally stereotyped. Unlike other mythologies, Aboriginal stories are not spoken in the past tense, rather, it is fundamentally believed to be a teaching of the past, present and future.

Significance of Uluru and red ochre  

Uluru is considered sacred to the Aboriginal people as it is known to protect ancient spirits of the region. In this sense, Uluru is deeply important to the Aboriginal cultural identity. As the creation of Uluru is central to Adnoartina’s story, this deity is regarded as an important figure in the Aboriginal culture. The blood of Marindi that was described to have dyed Uluru with red ochre is considered to be of spiritual value for Indigenous Australians. In the Aboriginal culture, this ochre is believed to hold spiritual power, particularly through the connection to Aboriginal mythology. As the creation of Uluru is fundamental to the story of Adnoartina, the red ochre from this site is considered to be particularly valued. This ochre is used for ceremonial practices and art to communicate the story of Adnoartina and related beings. For example, red ochre is essential for the 'Mindari' ceremony of the Diyari people, otherwise known as the 'peace ceremony.' Red ochre is used in this ceremony for the purpose of symbolic and decorative ritual as people are painted and given bundles of red ochre to form a spiritual connection to Adnoartina. Other forms of ceremonial practice were the red ochre expeditions which the Diyari people considered to be a spiritual journey. This expedition socially connected the Indigenous people as different tribes would travel to the source of Uluru’s red ochre. It was believed that the red ochre expeditions had the power to connect the Indigenous people to Adnoartina and other related beings. Red ochre was further significant to the Aboriginal community as it was historically used as a currency in trade. The ochre from Adnoartina’s story was valued in this context through the connection to mythology.

Role in traditional culture  

Dreamtime stories are closely linked with the Aboriginal tradition as they are a spiritual understanding of creation and how the universe came to be. It was believed that in reciting the dreamtime stories, people were able to experience the spirituality of beings such as Adnoartina. In the Aboriginal tradition, dreamtime stories were significant to unify and influence language, religion and the laws of the Aboriginal communities. Traditionally, Aboriginal mythology united local tribes as well as members of different tribes. Therefore, stories such as Adnoartina were considered to be an important aspect of the Aboriginal culture. Dreamtime stories have little relation to western understandings as they are formed through symbolic and spiritual concepts of creation. Unlike western knowledge, dreamtime stories are often communicated through speech, rather than transcribed. As described by Indigenous elder Graham Paulson, “an Aboriginal cosmogony begins in the ‘Dreamtime.' This is the time before the world was shaped in the way we know it to be now.” Adnoartina is considered to be a significant figure in this mode of knowledge to understand how Uluru was formed with red ochre. Paulson further describes how the place of emergence and interaction of spiritual beings are “valued according to the importance of that part of creation to the local tribal group.” As creation in Adnoartina’s story took place at Uluru, this deity holds sentiment to one of the most sacred sites in the Aboriginal culture. Uluru is considered to be a significant cultural landmark to various tribal groups and therefore, Adnoartina and related beings are valued as key figures in the dreamtime. The tradition of animal symbolism in dreamtime stories were considered to be purposeful in unifying all forms of life. Adnoartina reflects this tradition being a lizard guardian and was especially significant to the Diyari people as lizards were considered the most sacred of all animal beings.

Role in modern culture  

Adnoartina continues to be significant in the Aboriginal culture as dreamtime stories are passed down through generations of ancestors. The tradition of storytelling allows spiritual beings such as Adnoartina to live on through the legends of the dreamtime stories. This is considered to be important as Aboriginal mythology is valued by the Indigenous people as a timeless teaching. Beings such as Adnoartina are believed to offer spiritual knowledge that is significant to past, present and future Indigenous people. Therefore, the passing down of knowledge is fundamental to the Aboriginal religion. Adnoartina now appears as inspiration for the stories, art, ceremonies and music of modern culture. In modern art, red ochre is a primary material for many Aboriginal artists through its distinctive red colour and sheen quality. The ochre from Adnoartina’s story is especially valued through the spiritual link to Aboriginal mythology. This particular red ochre is called 'yamparnu' in the Aboriginal language. As dreamtime stories were often an oral teaching, art has become particularly important in modern culture to pass on knowledge of the dreamtime. This physical form of creative expression and sharing knowledge of beings such as Adnoartina is considered to be significant to the longevity of the Aboriginal culture.

As the creation of Uluru is central to Adnoartina’s story, this deity is linked to a historical landmark that continues to be regarded as a universal symbol of Australia. The world heritage status of Uluru further relates Adnoartina to modern culture through the category of ‘commemorative sites’ to respect the tradition of Aboriginal beliefs. In this sense, Uluru has been acknowledged as a spiritual site for the Indigenous Australians through the sacred link to beings such as Adnoartina. Uluru is famous in tourism for people to travel and witness what is widely perceived as one of Australia’s natural wonders. In this sense, tourism can have a positive effect through keeping Indigenous culture integrated in modern times. As Uluru has influenced modern culture through tourism, the story of Adnoartina continues to be shared to a modern audience. However, tourism can have a counter effect as there have been reports relating to the lack of respect for Indigenous land. A common concern relates to the cultural issues of promotional tourism in respecting the authenticity of sites considered sacred to the Indigenous Australians. As Adnoartina holds cultural significance to the Aboriginal people, the Australian government has listed restrictions on tourism such as banning people from climbing Uluru. This was stated to acknowledge the importance of Uluru to the Indigenous people and the spiritual connection to mythological beings such as Adnoartina.

Adnoartina was a character mentioned to be a part of the Old World Council in the 2022 novel Music in the Mirrors.

References

External links 
 http://collectionsearch.nma.gov.au/ce/Aboriginal%20lizard?solrsort=score%20desc&&page=2 Accessed 27 May 2020

Australian Aboriginal deities
Legendary reptiles